Neurolysin, mitochondrial is a protein that in humans is encoded by the NLN gene. It is a 78-kDa enzyme, widely distributed in mammalian tissues and found in various subcellular locations that vary with cell type. Neurolysin  exemplifies the ability of neuropeptidases to target various cleavage site sequences by hydrolyzing them in vitro, and metabolism of neurotensin is the most important role of neurolysin in vivo. Neurolysin has also been implicated in pain control, blood pressure regulation, sepsis, reproduction, cancer biology pathogenesis of stroke, and glucose metabolism.

Structure

Gene 

The NLN gene lies on the chromosome location of 5q12.3 and consists of 14 exons.

Protein 

Neurolysin, with 704 amino acid residues, is a zinc metalloendopeptidase with a conserved HEXXH motif. It has an overall prolate ellipsoid shape, with a deep narrow channel dividing it into two roughly equal domains. The catalytic site is contained within a thermolysin-like region found in many metallopeptidases and located in the domain near the floor of the channel.

Function 

Neurolysin hydrolyzes only peptides containing 5-17 amino acids by cleaving at a limited set of sites. The specificity of neurolysin for small bioactive peptides is due to the presence of large structural elements erected over its active site region that allow substrates access only through a deep narrow channel. In vitro, neurolysin exemplifies the ability of some neuropeptidases to target diverse cleavage site sequences. In vivo, their most established role is cleaving neurotensin between its 10th and 11th residues to produce inactive fragments and it has been recently identified as a non-AT1-non-AT2 angiotensin-binding site, with function pertaining to the rennin-angiotensin system. Neurotensin is involved in many processes including mast cell degranulation and regulation of central nervous system dopaminergic and cholinergic circuits. A lower level of neurotensin is associated with schizophrenia, and it is implicated in cardiovascular disorders, addiction, Huntington disease and Parkinson disease. Neurotensin is also one of the most potent blockers of pain perception.

Clinical significance 

Metabolism of neurotensin is the most important role of neurolysin in vivo and has been identified as a non-AT1-non-AT2 angiotensin-binding site. Neurotensin is involved in many processes including mast cell degranullation and regulation of central nervous system dopaminergic and cholinergic circuits. Neurolysin has also been implicated in pain control, blood pressure regulation, sepsis, reproduction, cancer biology, pathogenesis of stroke, and glucose metabolism. Inhibition of neurolysin has been shown to produce neurotensin-induced analgesia in mice, and control of neurotensin levels by neurolysin may serve as a potential target for antipsychotic therapies.

Interactions 

This protein is known to interact with:
 Neurotensin
 HIV-1

References

Further reading